Roberto La Rocca (born 9 July 1988) is a Venezuelan racing driver.

Career

Early career
Born in Caracas, La Rocca started his racing career in Skip Barber Southern Regional Series in 2008, finishing fourth. Also he spent ten races in Skip Barber National Championship in 2009.

After one-year absence he switched to F2000 Championship Series. He joined HP-Tech team and finished on the fifth place in the championship. He remained in the series for 2012 with the same team, winning eleven from fourteen races on his way to the championship title.

European F3 Open
Also in 2012 La Rocca moved in Europe and debuted in European F3 Open Championship with Team West-Tec F3. Finishing tenth with six point-scoring finishes. La Rocca will continue with Team West-Tec in 2013 European F3 Open Championship.

GP3 Series
La Rocca was supposed to make his GP3 Series debut with Bamboo Engineering in 2013. However, two months before the start of the season, he was replaced by Carmen Jordá due to uncertainty from his sponsors.

Auto GP
In August 2013 La Rocca Signed on a short term deal with Virtuosi Racing by Comtec. In the first round La Rocca finished 7th beating the drivers in the main team Virtuosi Racing. <Comtec Racing> are looking into the possibility of a main assault in Auto GP next season alongside there Renault 3.5 campaign, a series which may interest La Rocca.

Racing record

Career summary

Complete Auto GP results
(key) (Races in bold indicate pole position) (Races in italics indicate fastest lap)

References

External links

1991 births
Living people
Sportspeople from Caracas
Venezuelan people of Italian descent
Venezuelan racing drivers
Euroformula Open Championship drivers
British Formula Three Championship drivers
Auto GP drivers
Team West-Tec drivers
Hitech Grand Prix drivers
Comtec Racing drivers
Virtuosi Racing drivers